Panabandan (also Romanized as Panābandān; also known as Panāh, Panāh Bandān, Panāmandān, and Panāvandān) is a village in Khara Rud Rural District, in the Central District of Siahkal County, Gilan Province, Iran. At the 2006 census, its population was 409, in 124 families.

References 

Populated places in Siahkal County